Eudes Assis (from Boiçucanga, São Sebastião, São Paulo, Brazil) known as Chef Eudes, is a chef known in the Brazil for using ingredients of "caiçara" culture.

Early life

Assis had many siblings. His mother taught him about the preparation of fish and instilled a lover for "caiçara" cuisine. At 13 he started as a dishwasher at a restaurant in Camburi.

Chef 
In 2002, he joined as trainee in the famous Fasano Restaurant, in São Paulo. In 2006 he spent six months in France, at 'Le Cordon Bleu', 'school cooking,.[1] He matured in restaurants in Europe, and then spent four years as a chef aboard a private yacht visiting several countries, and learning about local cuisines. This led him to emphasize the use of regional ingredients, like tapioca and bananas, local seafood and dried fish, typical of coastal regions and of the "caiçara" cuisine. He  has collaborated with chefs including Ferran Adria, Alain Ducasse and Daniel Boulud. He is currently a chef in Restaurant Vinea Alphaville.

Eudes Assis prefers to use only non-industrialized products, and is adept and diffuser about cooking called "comfort food", known as cooking from scratch.

Eudes also teaches at universities, offering classes about cuisine. He further acts as a culinary consultant.

Specialties

Social projects

Eudes volunteers in "Projeto Buscapé", a nonprofit association of Boicucanga - North Coast of São Paulo. He teaches gastronomy to local children.
 
He is also curator of "Arraial Gastronomico do Projeto Buscapé". In 2013, this Project received the Social Responsibility award from "Prazeres da Mesa" magazine.

Awards
Most promising chief, 2010 by Prazeres da Mesa Magazine  
Best Seafood Restaurant  -  Restaurant "Seu Sebastião" by "Veja Comer&Beber" Magazine 
Award of Merit given by the city of São Sebastião for Disclosure of Brazilian Cuisine
Award Social responsibility given to the Buscapé Project, by "Prazeres da Mesa" magazine.

References

Brazilian chefs
Living people
Year of birth missing (living people)